Rogmocrypta elegans is a species of spiders in the jumping spider family, Salticidae. It is the type species of its genus (first described by Simon in 1885 as Chalcoscirtus elegans). It is found in New Caledonia and the Philippines.

References 

 Simon, E. (1901) Histoire naturelle des Araignees. Deuxieme edition. Paris (Roret), 2 3, pages 381-668

External links 
 Rogmocrypta elegans at jumping-spiders.com

Salticidae
Spiders of Oceania
Spiders described in 1885